"Nightmare at Ground Zero" is a television play that was broadcast by CBS on May 15, 1958, as part of the television series, Playhouse 90. It was written by Rod Serling and Paul Monash based on the book by John C. Clark and Robert Cahn.

Plot
Based on a true story, an advance party of five scientists is stationed in a bunker on Enewetak Atoll 20 miles from the detonation of the first hydrogen bomb test. They are trapped for 11 hours in a "hot" bunker due to miscalculations as to the size of the blast and the direction of the atomic fallout.

Cast
The cast included the following:

Barry Sullivan as Daniel Joyce
Jack Warden as Long
Carl Benton Reid as Gen. Tyler
Ainslie Pryor as Beloit
Edmon Ryan

Production
The program was produced as part of the second season of the television series, Playhouse 90. Franklin Schaffner was the director. The teleplay was written by Rod Serling and Paul Monash and adapted from the book, Nightmare at Ground Zero, by John C. Clark and Robert Cahn. It was aired on May 15, 1958.

Reception
United Press television critic William Ewald gave the production a mixed review. He praised the direction and sets and found the production to be "a gripper" when it stuck to telling the story. However, he wrote that it "stumbled" when it turned to conflict between two of the scientists over the morality of the bomb. Ewald found the latter scenes, with scientists exchanging quotes from Browning and Horace, to be clumsy, dramatically unbelievable, and embarrassing.

References

1958 television plays
1958 American television episodes
Playhouse 90 (season 2) episodes